Yury Sokolov (23 February 1961 – 14 March 1990) was a Soviet judoka. He competed in the men's half-lightweight event at the 1988 Summer Olympics.

References

External links
 

1961 births
1990 deaths
Soviet male judoka
Olympic judoka of the Soviet Union
Judoka at the 1988 Summer Olympics
Sportspeople from Saint Petersburg
Competitors at the 1986 Goodwill Games